Anar Nazirov (born 8 September 1985) is an Azerbaijani professional footballer who plays as a goalkeeper for Gabala FK.

Career
On 6 June 2013 he was released from his contract with Gabala. Nazirov then signed with fellow Azerbaijan Premier League side Sumgayit. On 13 January 2014, after six months with Sumgayit, Nazirov re-signed for Gabala on a one-year contract.
In July 2015 Nazirov moved to newly promoted Zira FK, on a one-year contract.

On 11 May 2017, Nazirov signed a new contract with Zira.

On 6 January 2019, Nazirov returned to Gabala FK for a third spell with the club, signing on a 18-month contract from Zira.

Statistics

Club

Honours
Gabala
 Azerbaijan Cup: 2018–19

References

External links
Profile on PFL.az

1985 births
Living people
Azerbaijani footballers
People from Qakh
Kapaz PFK players
Turan-Tovuz IK players
FK Standard Sumgayit players
Sumgayit FK players
Gabala FC players
Zira FK players
Azerbaijan Premier League players
Association football goalkeepers
Neftçi PFK players
Azerbaijan international footballers